Edson Rodrigues Farias (born 12 January 1992), known as Edson Paraíba, is a Brazilian football forward who plays for Portuguese club Vilafranquense.

Career
On 23 September 2012, he joined Hungarian club Videoton FC. In August 2014, he joined Paços de Ferreira.

On 23 June 2021, he signed with Penafiel.

Club statistics

References

External links
 at vidi.hu
 at hlsz.com
 
 
 

1992 births
People from Juazeiro do Norte
Sportspeople from Ceará
Living people
Brazilian footballers
Association football forwards
Iraty Sport Club players
Fehérvár FC players
F.C. Paços de Ferreira players
Bucheon FC 1995 players
C.D. Feirense players
F.C. Penafiel players
U.D. Vilafranquense players
Campeonato Paranaense players
Nemzeti Bajnokság I players
Primeira Liga players
K League 2 players
Liga Portugal 2 players
Brazilian expatriate footballers
Expatriate footballers in Hungary
Brazilian expatriate sportspeople in Hungary
Expatriate footballers in Portugal
Brazilian expatriate sportspeople in Portugal
Expatriate footballers in South Korea
Brazilian expatriate sportspeople in South Korea